Weninger is a German surname. Notable people with the surname include:

Francis Xavier Weninger (1805–1888), Austrian Jesuit missionary and author
Jeff Weninger, (b. ? ), American politician
Josef Weninger (1886–1959), Austrian anthropologist
Wenz Weninger, member of the German industrial metal band Megaherz

See also
Wenninger
Weininger

German-language surnames